The Design Award of the Federal Republic of Germany is the official design award for Germany presented by the German Ministry for Economics and Technology. The award was given for the first time under the name 'Federal Award for Good Design' in 1969 and thereafter every two years. Moreover, the focus of the award was changed on each occasion. The name of the award was first changed in 1992. Thereafter, the Federal Product Design Award and the Federal Award Promoter of Design — which went to a personality for achievements in the design field — were presented annually. Since 2006, it has been called the Design Award of the Federal Republic of Germany and is given for outstanding achievements in the fields of product and communication design, and to a personality in the design sector. Since 2012, the prize competition has been administered by DMY Berlin GmbH & Co. KG.

A company can only enter the competition for the Design Award if its product has already been awarded a national or international design prize. Another precondition for entry is that companies must have been nominated by the Ministries and Senators of the Federal States or by the Federal Ministry of Economics and Technology.

German Design Awards by the German Design Council 
Since 2012, the German Design Council (Rat für Formgebung) hosts the German Design Awards, which honour innovative products and projects, their manufacturers and designers in the German and international design sector. Only those formally nominated can take part in the competition. The evaluation criteria for nomination include the overall concept, sustainability, aesthetics, durability and functionality, amongst other things.

References

Design awards
German awards
German design